Mankovo is a rural locality (a village) in Ivanovskoye Rural Settlement, Vashkinsky District, Vologda Oblast, Russia. The population was 1 as of 2002.

Geography 
Mankovo is located 50 km north of Lipin Bor (the district's administrative centre) by road. Averino is the nearest rural locality.

References 

Rural localities in Vashkinsky District